Kaos Theory was a short series of compilation albums by Telstar Records which were compiled from "hardcore rave" records that were not on general release to the public. Many of these artists later became known for their drum and bass material.

The four volumes were released in quick succession during the "hardcore" rave period during the early 1990s in the United Kingdom.

Volume 1 

 "G-Force (Energy Flow)" - The Prodigy
 "Let Me Be Your Fantasy (No Fantasy Phase)" - Haywire
 "Nightbird" - Convert
 "Feel Real Good (Remix)" - Manix
 "Instructions of Life" - Turntable Symphony
 "Maniac" - The Alcan Warrors
 "Evil Surrounds Us" - Wishdokta
 "Running Out of Time (Milky Way Mix)" - Digital Orgasm
 "There Is No Law" - Messiah
 "Dance Hall Dangerous (Terrorise Mix)" - Hackney Hardcore
 "The Green Man" - Shut Up and Dance
 "Night of the Living E Heads" - The Hypnotist
 "Jellywobble (Blob a Lob a Mix)" - Noise Engineer
 "The Bouncer" - Kicks Like a Mule
 "Asi Mi Gusta a Mi" - Chimo Bayo
 "Different Story (Different Mix)" - Bowa

Volume 2
 "Nightmare" - Kid Unknown
 "Evapor-8 (Inciner 8 Mix)" - Altern 8
 "Music Takes You (2 Bad Mice Remix)" - Blame
 "Injected with a Poison" - Praga Khan
 "Temple of Dreams" - Messiah
 "It's Just a Feeling" - Terrorize
 "Move Your Feet (Fantasy UFO Remix)" - M-D-Emm
 "Fires Burning" - Run Tings
 "Take Me Away" - Dub Collective
 "Put the Bassdrum On" - The Ascendant Masters
 "Future Sound" - Phuture Assassins
 "Vinyl Energy" - Rhythmatic
 "Time to Get Ill" - 4 Hero
 "Smokin' Chalice" - Project One
 "Invasion (The F-O-A-D Remix)" - The Alcan Warriors
 "Feed the World (Cut the Red Tape Mix)" - Fantasy UFO

Volume 3 
 "Try to Love Me" - Manix
 "Hypnotic St 8" - Altern 8
 "Sesame's Treet" - Smart E's
 "Rave Alert" - Praga Khan
 "Trip II the Moon" - Acen
 "Burn Cali Weed" - A Sides
 "Gun" - Nino
 "Work It Out" - F O A D
 "This Is the Sound of the Underground" - Krome and Time
 "The Wobbler" - Xenophobia
 "Under Mi Sensi" - Barrington Levy
 "Searchin' for My Rizla" - Ratpack
 "Krisp Biscuit" - Ruffige Cru
 "Brainstorm" - Brainstorm
 "Braineater" - Danse City
 "The Ice Cream Van from Hell" - Earth Leakage Trip

Volume 4

 "I Feel Love" - Messiah
 "Do It Jah" - The Dark Syndicate
 "Number One" - Kicks Like a Mule
 "Street of Rage" - 3 Sample
 "Respect Is Due" - DJ Nex
 "Walking in Memphis" - MRM
 "Toontown" - Noise Overload
 "Far from a River" - Cosmic Brain
 "Virtual" - The Black Dog
 "We Can Be" - Well Hung Parliament
 "Initiation" - Faith Department
 "Do It" - Shify Overload
 "Searchin'" - Conscious
 "Mercurial" - Euphoria
 "Shift" - Havanna
 "P G Tips" - P G Tips

References

Compilation album series
1990s compilation albums
Dance music compilation albums
Rave
Breakbeat hardcore